Norman Jeffrey Healey (March 25, 1966 – March 2, 2008) was a Canadian blues, rock and jazz singer, guitarist, and songwriter who attained popularity in the 1980s and 1990s. He reached No. 5 on the U.S. Billboard Hot 100 chart with "Angel Eyes" and reached the Top 10 in Canada with the songs "I Think I Love You Too Much" and "How Long Can a Man Be Strong".

Early life
Born in Toronto, Ontario, Canada, Healey was raised in the city's west end. He was adopted as an infant; his adoptive father was a firefighter. When he was almost one year old, Healey lost his sight due to retinoblastoma, a rare cancer of the eyes. His eyes had to be surgically removed, and he was given ocular prostheses.

Early career and success

Healey began playing guitar when he was three, developing his unique style of playing the instrument flat on his lap. At nine years old, his musical talents were showcased in an interview on the TVOntario children's programme Cucumber. When he was 15, Healey formed the band Blue Direction, a four-piece that primarily played bar-band cover tunes and featured bassist Jeremy Littler, drummer Graydon Chapman, and schoolmate Rob Quail on second guitar. The band played at clubs in Toronto, including the Colonial Tavern.

Healey began hosting a jazz and blues show on radio station CIUT-FM, where he was known for playing from his massive collection of vintage 78 rpm gramophone records.

Shortly thereafter he was introduced to bassist Joe Rockman and drummer Tom Stephen, with whom he formed a trio, the Jeff Healey Band. The band made their first public appearance at the Birds Nest, located upstairs at Chicago's Diner on Queen Street West in Toronto. They received a write-up in Toronto's NOW magazine, and soon were playing almost nightly in local clubs, such as Grossman's Tavern and the famed blues club Albert's Hall (where Jeff Healey was discovered by guitarists Stevie Ray Vaughan and Albert Collins).

After being signed to Arista Records in 1988, the band released the album See the Light, which appeared on the RPM Top 100 chart in 1989. It featured the hit single "Angel Eyes" and the song "Hideaway", which was nominated for a Grammy Award for Best Rock Instrumental Performance. While the band was recording See the Light, they were also filming (and recording for the soundtrack of) the Patrick Swayze film Road House. Healey had numerous acting scenes in the movie with Swayze, as his band was the house cover band for the bar featured in the movie. In 1990, the band won the Juno Award for Canadian Entertainer of the Year. The albums Hell to Pay and Feel This gave Healey 10 charting singles in Canada between 1990 and 1994, including a cover of The Beatles' "While My Guitar Gently Weeps", which featured George Harrison and Jeff Lynne on backing vocals and acoustic guitar.

Later work and life

By the release of the 2000 album Get Me Some, Healey began to concentrate on jazz.

He went on to release three CDs of music of traditional American jazz from the 1920s and 1930s. He had been sitting in with these types of bands around Toronto since the beginning of his music career. Though known primarily as a guitarist, Healey also played trumpet during live performances.  His main jazz group for touring and recording was Jeff Healey's Jazz Wizards.

Healey was an avid record collector and amassed a collection of well over 30,000 78 rpm records. Starting in 1990 he hosted a radio program of very early jazz on CIUT at the University of Toronto with Colin Bray. Later he went national on CBC Radio's program entitled My Kind of Jazz, in which he played records from his vast vintage jazz collection. He moved the show two years later to Jazz FM - CJRT; as a part of ongoing celebrations for what would have been Healey's 50th birthday in 2016, the latter program began to air in repeats Wednesdays 9pm on jazz.fm.
 
For many years, Healey toured throughout North America and Europe and performed at his club, "Healey's" on Bathurst Street in Toronto, where he played with his blues band on Thursday nights and also with his jazz group on Saturday afternoons. The club moved to a larger location at 56 Blue Jays Way and was rechristened "Jeff Healey's Roadhouse." Though he had lent his name to the club and often played there, Jeff Healey did not own or manage the bar. (The name came from the 1989 film, Road House, in which Healey appeared.) At the time of his death, he had been planning to perform a series of shows in the United Kingdom, Germany, and the Netherlands, with his other band, the Jeff Healey Blues Band (aka the "Healey's House Band") in April 2008.

Over the years, Healey toured and sat in with many well-known performers, including The Allman Brothers, Bonnie Raitt, Stevie Ray Vaughan, Buddy Guy, BB King, ZZ Top, Steve Lukather, Eric Clapton and many more. In 2006, Healey appeared on Deep Purple vocalist Ian Gillan's CD/DVD Gillan's Inn.

Healey discovered and helped develop the careers of other musical artists, including Terra Hazelton, Amanda Marshall, Shannon Curfman, and Philip Sayce

In early 2009, Healey's album Mess of Blues won in The 8th Annual Independent Music Awards for Best Blues Album.

In 2009, Healey was inducted into the Terry Fox Hall of Fame.

In June 2011, Woodford Park in Toronto was renamed Jeff Healey Park in his honour.

In 2014, Healey was inducted into Canada's Walk of Fame. In September 2016, Jeff Healey was inducted into the Mississauga Music Walk of Fame. In March 2016 the posthumous album Heal My Soul was released, followed by the companion album Holding On in December of the same year. Both records were compiled by Roger Costa from unreleased recordings. The 12 track Heal My Soul featured six covers and a number of collaborations with Marti Frederiksen, Arnold Lanni and Stevie Salas. The 15 track Holding On album contains ten live tracks recorded in 1999 at the Rockefeller Music Hall in Norway and five studio tracks.

Personal life
Healey married Krista Miller in 1992; they had a daughter and were divorced in 1998. He married Cristie Hall in 2004 and had a son with her.

Illness and death
On January 11, 2007, Healey underwent surgery to remove metastatic cancer tissue from both lungs. In the previous 18 months, he had two sarcomas removed from his legs. On March 2, 2008, Healey died of sarcoma in his home town of Toronto at the age of 41. He was buried at Park Lawn Cemetery, Mausoleum & Cremation Centre in Etobicoke, Ontario. Healey's death came a month before the release of Mess of Blues, which was his first rock/blues album in eight years.

Discography

Jeff Healey Band

Jeff Healey solo and with The Jazz Wizards

Jeff Healey solo 
2002: Among Friends (Sensation; Stony Plain)
2003: Live at Healey's (Bolder)
2004: Adventures in Jazzland (HealeyOphonic; Stony Plain)
2006: It's Tight Like That (Stony Plain)
2008: Mess of Blues (Ruf; Stony Plain)
2009: Songs From The Road (Ruf; Stony Plain)
2010: Last Call (Stony Plain)
2016: Heal My Soul (Convexe Entertainment; Provogue)
2016: Holding On: A 'Heal My Soul' Companion (Convexe Entertainment; Provogue)
2020: Heal My Soul: Deluxe Edition (Eagle Rock Entertainment)

Live albums
1993: Live in Belgium (CD & DVD) (Eagle Vision)
2003: Live at Healey's (Bolder)
2005: Live at Montreux 1999 (Eagle)
2011: Live at Grossman's 1994 (Eagle Rock North/Convexe)
2013: As The Years Go Passing By: Live in Germany 1989-1995-2000 (in-akustik) - note: the first release of archival material compiled with the participation and full approval of the Jeff Healey Estate.
2013: Live From NYC (Eagle Rock)
2014: Live at the Legendary Horseshoe Tavern, 1993 (Eagle Rock)

Compilations
1998: The Very Best of Jeff Healey (RCA)
1998: The Very Best of Jeff Healey (MSI Music Distribution)
1999: Master Hits (Arista)
2004: The Platinum and Gold Collection (Arista)
2008: Super Hits (Sony BMG)
2008: Legacy: Volume One (Ear Music; Arbor Records Ltd)
2013: Playlist: The Very Best of the Jeff Healey Band (Arista)
2013: House on Fire – Demos & Rarities (Eagle Rock North)
2015: The Best of the Stony Plain Years (Stony Plain)

Appearances on other albums
1988 The Promise by Matt Minglewood (Savannah Music/WEA)
1995 Let It Rock! (The Rock 'n' Roll Album of the Decade) (Quality Records) - Ronnie Hawkins' 60th Birthday Bash, Live at Massey Hall, featuring The Band, Jerry Lee Lewis, Carl Perkins, Larry Gowan.
1999 Blues Blues Blues by Jimmy Rogers All-Stars (Atlantic Records)
2003 Live At Last by Matt Minglewood Band feat. Jeff Healey (Norton Records)
2004 What's Love? A Tribute to Tina Turner (Versailles Records)
2006 Full Circle by Walter Trout (Ruf Records)

Compilation inclusions
1997 Hits of the 80's
2002 While My Guitar Gently Weeps
2006 Saturday Night Blues: 20 Years (CBC)

Singles

Filmography
1989: Road House as Cody
1999: Live at Montreux
2004: See The Light (BMG)
2013: As The Years Go Passing By: Live in Germany 1989-1995-2000 (in-akustik)

See also
Canadian blues
Canadian rock
Music of Canada

References

External links 

Official Facebook Page
Official Youtube Channel
Official Jeff Healey Biography
Official Jeff Healey Discography

 

1966 births
2008 deaths
20th-century Canadian guitarists
20th-century Canadian male singers
21st-century Canadian guitarists
21st-century Canadian male singers
Arista Records artists
Blind musicians
Canadian blind people
Blind singers
Blues rock musicians
Canadian adoptees
Canadian blues guitarists
Canadian male guitarists
Canadian radio personalities
Canadian rock guitarists
Deaths from cancer in Ontario
Electric blues musicians
Independent Music Awards winners
Jazz radio presenters
Juno Award winners
Lead guitarists
Musicians from Toronto
People from Etobicoke
Rhythm guitarists
RCA Records artists
Canadian Disability Hall of Fame
Stony Plain Records artists
Provogue Records artists